Untitled (Black Is) is the third studio album by the British R&B musical group Sault, released on 19 June 2020 through the independent record label Forever Living Legends. The album has been met with positive critical reception.

Release 
Untitled (Black Is) was released on 19 June 2020 by the independent record label Forever Living Legends. The album was originally available for free as a digital download, with proceeds from subsequent sales going to charity. Accompanying the release was a mission statement posted online by Sault, saying:

The release was followed 13 weeks later by Untitled (Rise), a similarly composed and themed album.

Critical reception

Untitled (Black Is) was met with widespread critical acclaim. At Metacritic, which assigns a normalized rating out of 100 to reviews from professional critics, the album received an average score of 86, based on 5 reviews.

Reviewing for AllMusic, Andy Kellman hailed Untitled (Black Is) as "an urgent outpouring of grief, anger, affirmation, and consolation, [that makes it seem that] virtually anything seems possible for their future". Marcus J. Moore of NPR noted that the lyrics explore the entirety of the black experience, including anger at the killing of African Americans by the police, sorrow in mourning, and the intimacy of daily life. Tom Doyle of Mojo called it "another masterwork from a group with no peers", and Q magazine's Steve Yates described it as "beautiful and potent stuff". Gordon Rutherford of Louder Than War regarded the album as a "zeitgeist" and the best of the year, a "powerful, potent protest album that is musically magnificent". Lizzie Manno of Paste also deemed it an "album-of-the-year contender" as well as "a revolutionary soundtrack to 2020". Salem Collo-Julin of Chicago Reader echoed these sentiments, calling this album the "soundtrack for the 2020 revolution" because the "revelatory jazz-soaked soul music on Untitled is a call to action". Writing for The Philadelphia Inquirer, Dan DeLuca called it "a seductive listen" whose powerful lyrics, coupled with a Juneteenth release and roots in several black music genres, "raise ... a fist against oppression and celebrates collective strength". Robert Christgau highlighted the songs "Stop Dem" and "Don't Shoot Guns Down" while summarising the music as "dancefloor positivity idealized and politicized, most militantly on [this] third album, which surfaced just in time for a BLM moment we're free to pray lasts approximately forever".  BBC 6 Music named this album as their number one recommended album of 2020.

"Wildfires" was ranked the fifth-best song of 2020 according to The Guardian.

Track listing
"Out the Lies" (Kadeem Clarke, Dean Josiah Cover, Cleopatra Nikolic, and Melisa Young)– 2:01
"Stop Dem" (Cover and Nikolic)– 3:38
"Hard Life" (Cover, Michael Kiwanuka, and Nikolic)– 4:34
"Don't Shoot Guns Down" (Cover and Nikolic)– 1:53
"Wildfires" (Cover and Nikolic)– 3:27
"X" (Clarke, Cover, and Nikolic)– 1:24
"Sorry Ain't Enough" (Cover and Nikolic)– 5:00
"Black Is" (Clarke, Cover, and Nikolic)– 1:53
"Bow" (Cover and Kiwanuka)– 4:05
"This Generation" (Cover)– 0:47
"Why We Cry Why We Die" (Cover and Nikolic)– 2:44
"Black" (Cover and Nikolic)– 3:54
"US" (Clarke, Cover, Nikolic, and Young)– 1:06
"Eternal Life" (Clarke, Cover, and Nikolic)– 3:59
"Only Synth in Church" (Clarke and Cover)– 0:56
"Monsters" (Cover, Nikolic, and Young)– 3:28
"June Child" (Cover, Nikolic, and Young)– 0:59
"Miracles" (Cover, Nikolic, and Young)– 4:18
"Hold Me" (Cover and Nikolic)– 2:45
"Pray Up Stay Up" (Cover)– 3:45

Chart performance

Personnel
Sault
Kadeem Clarke
Dean Josiah "Inflo" Cover
Cleopatra "Cleo Sol" Nikolic
Melisa "Kid Sister" Young

Additional musicians
Laurette Josiah– vocals on "This Generation"
Michael Kiwanuka– vocals on "Bow"

References

External links

Review aggregate by Album of the Year
Review from Albumism
Review from Album Reviews blog

2020 albums
Sault (band) albums
Self-released albums
Albums produced by Inflo
Albums free for download by copyright owner
Funk albums by English artists